Murat Kazbekovich Akhedzhak (July 18, 1962, village Pseytuk, Takhtamukaysky District, Adyghe Autonomous Oblast, Krasnodar Krai, USSR —  December 7, 2010, Freiburg, Germany) was a Deputy Head of Administration of Krasnodar Krai in the 2002–2010. He was awarded  medal (posthumously).

He came from a princely family Akhedzhakov's. He graduated from Kuban State Technological University on speciality  civil engineer  (1983). Candidate of Technical Sciences.

In May 2005, he was urgently hospitalized in a Krasnodar hospital with the diagnosis of Peritonitis, which turned out to be a complication of acute appendicitis (appendectomy). After that he was sent to the clinic in Freiburg, Germany, where he went a long course of treatment, moving through more than 30 operations. A year later he returned to Krasnodar and continued to work in the administration of Krasnodar Krai.

The evening of December 7, 2010 he died of a heart attack.

Murat Akhedzhak was married, he had two children.

References

External links
 Биография
 Ахеджак заложил основы стабильности Кубани, говорится в некрологе

1962 births
2010 deaths
People from Takhtamukaysky District
Yabloko politicians
United Russia politicians
21st-century Russian politicians
Politics of Krasnodar Krai
Circassian people of Russia